Rivière Qui Barre is a hamlet in central Alberta, Canada, within Sturgeon County. It was founded in 1885 by French-speaking settlers, adding a post office in 1895. The name is the French translation of Kipohtakaw (“river that bars the way”), the Cree name of the nearby river.

Demographics 

As a designated place in the 2016 Census of Population conducted by Statistics Canada, Riviere Qui Barre had
a population of 15 living in 4 of its 6 total private dwellings.

Services 
While the hamlet of Rivière Qui Barre has only 91 people, it is a recreation and education center for this part of Sturgeon County.

The Rivière Qui Barre Arena provides an indoor ice hockey venue for the area.  In January 2017, the Government of Canada announced that the arena's operator, the Rivière Qui Barre Agricultural Society, would receive a $200,000 grant for upgrades as part of a series of infrastructure projects celebrating the 150th anniversary of Canada becoming a nation.  In March 2017, Sturgeon County added a further $100,000 grant for the renovations.

The Sturgeon School Division operates Camilla School in Rivière Qui Barre, serving 470 elementary and junior high students from the region in the 2016–17 school year.  In March 2017, the Alberta Minister of Education announced that a new Camilla School will be built by 2021, replacing the structure built in 1954.

See also 
List of communities in Alberta
List of hamlets in Alberta

References 

1895 establishments in Alberta
Designated places in Alberta
Hamlets in Alberta
Populated places established in 1885
Sturgeon County